Matendo is an administrative ward in Kigoma District of Kigoma Region in Tanzania. 
In 2016 the Tanzania National Bureau of Statistics report there were 14,306 people in the ward, from 22,458 in 2012. Prior to 2014 Kidahwe Ward was a village in the Matendo Ward before splitting off to form its won new ward.

Villages / neighborhoods 
The ward has 3 villages and 12 hamlets.

 Matendo
 Kibalini
 Kibumba
 Kinogodo
 Kumuhama
 Majengo
 Samwa
 Mkuti
 Nyamiaga
 Tunguruza Shuleni
 Pamila
 Mibangani
 Pamila
 Rukaranka
 Samwa

References

Wards of Kigoma Region